Sabir Agougil (born 18 January 2002) is a professional footballer who currently plays as a midfielder for NAC Breda. Born in the Netherlands, he has represented Morocco at youth level.

Club career
Agougil joined NAC Breda at the age of ten, having previously played for Unitas '30. He made his debut in a 2–0 Eerste Divisie win against ADO Den Haag.

International career
Agougil is eligible to represent both the Netherlands and Morocco at international level. He has trained with the under-17 and under-23 teams of Morocco.

Personal life
Sabir's brother, Oualid, is also a footballer and currently plays for Ajax.

Career statistics

Club

Notes

References

2002 births
Living people
Footballers from Rotterdam
Dutch sportspeople of Moroccan descent
Dutch footballers
Moroccan footballers
Morocco youth international footballers
Association football midfielders
NAC Breda players
Eerste Divisie players